HD 40307 g is an exoplanet candidate suspected to be orbiting in the habitable zone of HD 40307. It is located 42 light-years away in the direction of the southern constellation Pictor. The planet was discovered by the radial velocity method, using the European Southern Observatory's HARPS apparatus  by a team of astronomers led by Mikko Tuomi at the University of Hertfordshire and Guillem Anglada-Escude of the University of Göttingen, Germany.

The existence of the planet was disputed in 2015, as more Doppler spectroscopy data has become available.

Planetary characteristics
The codiscoverer Hugh Jones, of the University of Hertfordshire in England, surmised: "The longer orbit of the new planet means that its climate and atmosphere may be just right to support life."

However, another astronomer, Rory Barnes of the University of Washington, had already studied the orbits of the planets b, c, and d. First, Barnes had presumed b to take on too much tidal heating for it to be terrestrial, instead predicting a "mini-Neptune". He thought that b, c, and d had all migrated inward, which extrapolates to e and f as well, which are further out, but not by much. It is possible that HD 40307 g has also migrated into where it is now. The discoverers of HD 40307 g did not try to refute Barnes, on the nature of b and its extrapolation to the other planets. The composition of g is unsettled. Lead author Mikko Tuomi, also of the University of Hertfordshire, stated
"If I had to guess, I would say 50-50 ... But the truth at the moment is that we simply do not know whether the planet is a large Earth or a small, warm Neptune without a solid surface."

See also
 Circumstellar habitable zone
 Extrasolar planet
 List of potentially habitable exoplanets
 Planetary habitability

References

External links
 

HD 40307
Pictor (constellation)
Exoplanet candidates